Alex Boyd and similar names may refer to:

Alex Boyd (photographer) (born 1984), Scottish artist & photographer
Alex Boyd (author) (born 1969), Canadian poet, essayist, editor, and critic
Alex Boyd (footballer) (1883–1962), Australian rules footballer

Alexander 
Alexander Boyd (1764–1857), U.S. Representative from New York
Alexander Boyd, 3rd Lord Boyd (died after 1508), Scottish noble
 Alexander Boyd (county solicitor) (1834–1870), murdered by a lynching party of Ku Klux Klan members
Alexander Boyd Baird (1891–1967), Canadian businessman and Senator

Alexandra 
Alexandra Boyd, British actress